The Sunland 41 is a complex of residential twin skyscrapers located in Linkou District, New Taipei City, Taiwan. The towers were designed by Taiwanese architectural firm TMA Architects & Associates and Japanese architect Kenzō Tange and were completed in 2020. After its completion, the complex became the tallest in the district, surpassing the previous title holder Skyline Landmark. As of January 2021, the towers are the ninth tallest in New Taipei City.

See also 
 List of tallest buildings in Taiwan
 List of tallest buildings in New Taipei City
 Linkou District
 Skyline Landmark

References

External List
Official Website of Sunland 41 (in Chinese) 

2020 establishments in Taiwan
Residential buildings completed in 2020
Residential skyscrapers in Taiwan
Skyscrapers in New Taipei
Twin towers
Apartment buildings in Taiwan